Karolína Kubáňová (born 27 May 2001) is a Czech tennis player.

Kubáňová has a career-high singles ranking by the Women's Tennis Association (WTA) of 776, achieved on 9 December 2019, and a best WTA doubles ranking of 367, set on 22 August 2022.

She won her first bigger ITF title at the 2022 Macha Lake Open, in the doubles draw partnering Aneta Kučmová.

ITF Circuit finals

Doubles: 12 (8 titles, 4 runner-ups)

Junior finals

ITF Finals

Singles: 1 runner-up

References

External links
 
 

2001 births
Living people
Czech female tennis players
21st-century Czech women